Freeman King (1943–2002) was an American comedian known for such television shows and films as The Sonny & Cher Comedy Hour, Fletch, Dance Fever, Under The Rainbow, and The Buddy Holly Story.

At the suggestion of Redd Foxx, King teamed with comedian Murray Langston and became regular performers on The Sonny & Cher Comedy Hour.

King died in Los Angeles at age 59 of a heart attack.

References

External links

African-American male comedians
American male comedians
African-American actors
American male film actors
American male television actors
20th-century American writers
1943 births
2002 deaths
People from Rankin County, Mississippi
20th-century African-American writers
21st-century African-American people